The Graduate Berkeley (Originally called the Hotel Durant or the Durant Hotel) is a historic boutique hotel located in Berkeley, California in the United States. It is located in downtown Berkeley, just off campus of the University of California, Berkeley. The hotel is listed on the Berkeley register of historic places.

History

The hotel was built, in Spanish Colonial style, in 1928. It was designed by W. H. Weeks. It had 140 rooms and was both fire and earthquake resistant. It also had one of the first basement garages in the area.

It was named for Henry Durant. The bar, Henry's Publick House, is also a tribute to him. When the hotel opened it was described as a "modern luxury hotel". Harry Truman stayed at the hotel once.

Hostage incident

In 1990, 33 hostages were held at gun point at Henry's for seven hours by University of California, Berkeley student, Mehrdad Dashti, who had schizophrenia. The hotel bar was raided by police during the hold up. Dashti killed one hostage and an additional seven people were wounded.

Ownership
As of 2006, the hotel was owned and managed by Creative Hospitality. In 2007, the property was purchased by Joie de Vivre Hospitality for $14 million. Joie de Vivre invested $9 million in renovating the property. The hotel was in default in 2011 and the Royal Bank of Scotland took over as owner. Joie de Vivre continued to manage the property. In September 2012 it was put up for sale. The property was marketed by HVS Capital Corporation. In early 2013, they sold the hotel for approximately $27.3 million to Gemstone Hotels & Resorts. Upon the purchase, 98% of the staff remained from the previous ownership. The hotel is frequented by visitors to the University. In September 2015 it was purchased from Gemstone Hotels and Elliott Management Co. by Chicago-based Graduate Hotels for $47.5 million and renovated extensively, particularly the lobby and restaurant. Upon completion of renovations, the hotel was reopened with its present theme and name in May 2017.

Facilities

The hotel's theme is based on the University of California, Berkeley. Lonely Planet describes it as "cheekily" in style. A mobile made of books hangs from the lobby ceiling. The walls of the lobby are decorated in yearbook photos from the university. Hotel rooms feature "dictionary-covered shower curtains and bongs repurposed as bedside lamps." 

The gastropub inside the hotel is Henry's Publick House. In 2009, Henry's "Everything but the Kitchen Sink Bloody Mary" Bloody Mary was voted the best in the East Bay by East Bay Express. The bloody mary features tomato juice made in-house and is topped off with a splash of Guinness.

References

Buildings and structures in Berkeley, California
Hotels in the San Francisco Bay Area
Historic hotels in the United States
Residential buildings in Alameda County, California
Economy of Berkeley, California
1928 establishments in California
Hotel buildings completed in 1928
Spanish Colonial Revival architecture in California
W. H. Weeks buildings